Ehsanul Haque (born 1 December 1979) is a Bangladeshi cricketer.

Haque was part of the Bangladesh team that took part in Under-19 World Cup in 1998. When the Green Delta National Cricket League was given first-class status in 2000 he appeared for Chittagong in the first round of matches, this was therefore his first-class debut at the age of 20. In that season he scored 540 runs at an average of just under 39, but struggled during the next season. Despite this he made his Test debut in 2002 against Sri Lanka coming in at 3, he was hit by a bouncer 2nd ball, took 14 deliveries to get off the mark and was eventually dismissed for 2, in the second innings he scored five. He has not played a Test match since but he's been impressive in first-class form - averaging 52 over the last three seasons scoring 7 centuries with a highest score of 186.

Haque made his ODI debut as an opener against West Indies in 2002/03 and earned a place in the World Cup squad. He played in the first four pool games, scoring just 28 runs. In the match against Sri Lanka he was the third victim of Chaminda Vaas's Hat-trick and could have had the distinction of being dismissed first ball in consecutive matches if Chris Gayle had not dropped him at second slip off Vasbert Drakes.

References

External links

1979 births
Living people
Chittagong Division cricketers
Bangladeshi cricketers
Bangladesh Test cricketers
Bangladesh One Day International cricketers
Cricketers at the 2003 Cricket World Cup
People from Chittagong